Shawn Adam Delierre (born May 25, 1982) is a professional squash player who represents Canada. He reached a career-high world ranking of World No. 35 in March 2013.

He has played in three of the longest four PSA squash matches ever.

References

External links 
  (archive 3)
 
 
 

1982 births
Living people
Sportspeople from Montreal
Canadian male squash players
Commonwealth Games competitors for Canada
Squash players at the 2006 Commonwealth Games
Squash players at the 2010 Commonwealth Games
Pan American Games gold medalists for Canada
Pan American Games silver medalists for Canada
Pan American Games bronze medalists for Canada
Pan American Games medalists in squash
Squash players at the 2007 Pan American Games
Squash players at the 2011 Pan American Games
Squash players at the 2015 Pan American Games
Squash players at the 2019 Pan American Games
Competitors at the 2013 World Games
Medalists at the 2011 Pan American Games
Medalists at the 2015 Pan American Games
Medalists at the 2019 Pan American Games
21st-century Canadian people